Iván Calderón can refer to:
Iván Calderón (baseball) (1962–2003), Puerto Rican baseball player and murder victim
Iván Calderón (boxer) (born 1975), Puerto Rican Olympic boxer and professional boxing champion